Bathystethus is a genus of sea chubs native to the Pacific Ocean.

Species
There are currently two recognized species in this genus:
 Bathystethus cultratus (Bloch & J. G. Schneider, 1801) (Grey knifefish)
 Bathystethus orientale Regan, 1913 (Silver knifefish)

References

Scorpidinae